John Salmon Lamont (April 15, 1885—October 11, 1964) was a politician in Manitoba, Canada.  He served in the Legislative Assembly of Manitoba from 1936 to 1941 as a Liberal-Progressive representative.

Lamont was born in Montague, Prince Edward Island, and was educated at Prince of Wales College, the University of Manitoba and Princeton University.  He received a Master of Arts degree from Princeton and a law degree from Manitoba, and worked as a barrister-at-law.  Lamont also became reeve of the Rural Municipality of Assiniboia in 1931, and continued in this position after being elected to the provincial legislature.

He was elected to the legislature in the 1936 provincial election, defeating independent candidate Arthur Boivin by 132 votes in Iberville.  He served as a backbench supporter of John Bracken's government for the next five years, and was resoundingly defeated by Boivin in the 1941 election.

1885 births
1964 deaths
Manitoba Liberal Party MLAs